Chip Walbert (aka xCHIPxSEM) is a musician from Miami, Florida. He is best known for playing guitar in Until The End, Where Fear and Weapons Meet, and Destro.

History 
Walbert became active in the South Florida hardcore punk scene in 1995 and started his first band, Destro, in 1997 with high school friends Roy Ugarte, and future Glasseater guitarist, Ariel Arro. The band went on a brief hiatus in 1998 and he formed xMore Than Everx which only played a few shows. Destro started up again in late 1998 after drummer Ully and singer Manny left. New drummer Julio Marin of Promise No Tomorrow and later of Glasseater joined as did vocalist Kenn Marshall. The band recorded 2 records, an EP and a full length, played Hellfest 2000 and 2001 as well as Furnace Fest 2000 before breaking up in 2002. Walbert then formed All Hell Breaks Loose with members of Santa Sangre and Target Nevada. In 2002, Walbert also joined Where Fear and Weapons Meet and Until the End with Morning Again's John Wylie.

In 2003, he started Dance Floor Justice with Alex Leon of Target Nevada, All Hell Breaks Loose and Hockey Temper. In November 2004, drummer Joe Lamadrid suddenly died which prompted All Hell Breaks Loose to disband. He later played guitar in No Excuses, a Tallahassee-based straight edge hardcore band. As of 2018, Walbert was the guitarist for the South Florida band Phantom Drive.

He is also a collector of band t-shirts, especially of 1990s hardcore bands.

Related bands 

 Destro: 1997 – 2002
 xMore Than Everx: 1998<
 All Hell Breaks Loose: 2001 - 2004, 2006–present
 Where Fear and Weapons Meet: 2002 - 2004
 Until The End: 2002 - 2005
 Dance Floor Justice: 2003–Present
 Best Wishes: 2005-2006
 No Excuses: 2007–Present
 Morning Again: 2012, 2014

References

External links 
 Walbert's Blog on South Florida Hardcore
 Hows Your Edge Tradelist

Living people
Musicians from Miami
American rock guitarists
American male guitarists
Guitarists from Florida
Year of birth missing (living people)
Morning Again members
Where Fear and Weapons Meet members